Richard Annesley may refer to:
 Richard Annesley, 3rd Baron Altham (1655–1701), Dean of Exeter and son of Arthur, 1st Earl of Anglesey
 Richard Annesley, 6th Earl of Anglesey (1693–1761), Irish peer, kidnapper and bigamist, son of the 3rd Baron Altham
 Richard Annesley, 2nd Earl Annesley (1745–1824), Irish politician and Member of the Irish Parliament
 Richard John Dighton Annesley, 15th Viscount Valentia (1929–2005), British Army officer